Pułaski family was a Polish noble family of the Ślepowron coat of arms. Its most famous member was Casimir Pulaski.

Many of the family members were supporters of the Bar Confederation in the late 18th century.

Members
 Antoni Pułaski (1747-1813) deputy, Bar Confederate
 Franciszek Jan Pułaski (1875-1956) historian, diplomat
 Franciszek Pułaski (zm. 1769),  Bar Confederate
 Franciszek Ksawery Pułaski (1743-1769) starost,  Bar Confederate
 Józef Pułaski (1704–1769) starost, deputy,  Bar Confederate
 Casimir Pulaski (1746–1779),  Bar Confederate, officer in the American War of Independence, national hero of Poland and the USA
 Kazimierz Ferdynand Pułaski (1846-1926) landowner, historian

 
Polish toponymic surnames
Polish-language surnames